Bovaj (also Romanized as Bovāj and Bauaj; also known as Buj) is a village in Fasharud Rural District, in the Central District of Birjand County, South Khorasan Province, Iran. At the 2006 census, its population was 55, in 18 families.

References 

Populated places in Birjand County